Nykøbing Mors Cricket Club Ground is a cricket ground in Nykøbing Mors, Denmark.  The first recorded match held on the ground came in 1989 when Denmark Women played Ireland Women in a Women's One Day International in the 1989 Women's European Cup.  Six women's One Day Internationals were held at the ground during that tournament, and a further six were held there when Denmark hosted the 1999 Women's European Championship.

The ground has also held a number of international youth cricket tournaments.  It is the home ground of Nykøbing Mors Cricket Club.

References

External links
Nykøbing Mors Cricket Club Ground at ESPNcricinfo
Nykøbing Mors Cricket Club Ground at CricketArchive

Cricket grounds in Denmark